Ske-Dat-De-Dat: The Spirit of Satch is a 2014 album and the final studio release by American musician Dr. John. Produced by Dr. John and Sarah Morrow, it was released in August 2014. It contains songs from the repertoire of Louis Armstrong ("Satch") and features many guest musicians, such as The Blind Boys of Alabama and Bonnie Raitt.

Critical reception 
At Metacritic, which assigns a weighted average score out of 100 to reviews from mainstream critics, the album received an average score of 72% based on 11 reviews, indicating "generally favorable reviews".

The album was selected as a Downbeat Editor's Pick. The Los Angeles Times wrote that tribute albums come and go, "but it's a real rarity that can snap a listener to attention like Dr. John's new salute to jazz founding father Louis Armstrong. "Ske-Dat-De-Dat" turns many of the songs Armstrong recorded inside out and upside down, fast-forwarding them to 2014 with hip-hop beats, funk grooves and wildly inventive horn arrangements that are the work of John and his co-producer and arranger for the project, trombonist Sarah Morrow."

Robert H. Cataliotti's review in Living Blues magazine underlines that Sarah Morrow's "dynamic, textured, and swinging horn charts play a big part in shaping all the different stylistic approaches into a unified soundscape".

Track listing

Personnel 

Dr. John – vocals, piano, guitar, horn
James "12" Andrews – trumpet
Terence Blanchard – trumpet
The Blind Boys of Alabama – vocals
Carl Blouin Sr. – baritone saxophone
Oliver Bonie – baritone saxophone
Alonzo Bowens – horn
Brian Quezergue – horn
Wendell Brunious – flugelhorn
Shemekia Copeland – vocals
Tony Dagradi – tenor saxophone
Gregory Davis – trumpet
Tom Fischer – clarinet
Barney Floyd – trumpet
Bobby Floyd – Hammond B3
Alvin Ford, Jr. – drums
Rex Gregory – bass clarinet
Anthony Gullage – electric bass
Anthony Hamilton – vocals
Kevin Harris – tenor saxophone
Kirk Joseph – sousaphone
Mike Ladd – vocals
Ledisi – vocals
Khari Allen Lee – flute, alto saxophone
Roger Lewis – baritone saxophone
Eric Lucero – trumpet
Tom Mallone – horn
Kendrick Marshall – guitar, keyboards
The McCrary Sisters – vocals
Sarah Morrow – horn, trombone
Ivan Neville – Hammond B3
Roderick Paulin – alto saxophone
Nicholas Payton – trumpet
Derwin "Big D" Perkins – guitar
Ed Petersen – tenor saxophone
Bonnie Raitt – vocals
Donald Ramsey – electric bass
Herlin Riley – drums, tambourine
Jamison Ross – drums
Poncho Sanchez – percussions
Arturo Sandoval – trumpet
Telmary – vocals
Efrem Pierre Towns – trumpet
Reginald Veal – acoustic bass, electric bass
Nick Volz – trumpet
Jason Weaver – acoustic bass

Charts

References

External links 
 

Dr. John albums
2014 albums
Concord Records albums